The Endicott Gulls football team is a college football that competes as part of National Collegiate Athletic Association (NCAA) Division III, representing Endicott College in the New England Football Conference.

Playoff appearances

NCAA Division III
The Gulls have appeared in the Division III playoffs four times, with an overall record of 0–4.

References

External links
 

 
American football teams established in 2002
2002 establishments in Massachusetts